Penetopteryx is a genus of pipefishes.

Species
There are currently two recognized species in this genus:
 Penetopteryx nanus (N. Rosén, 1911) (lost pipefish) Western Atlantic
 Penetopteryx taeniocephalus Lunel, 1881 Indo-Pacific,(Oceanic pipefish) Madagascar to Kiritimati In Kiribati.

Both species areclassified as being of Least Concern by the IUCN.

References

Syngnathidae
Marine fish genera